Rock the Boat may refer to:

 "Rock the Boat" (The Hues Corporation song), 1974
 "Rock the Boat" (Aaliyah song), 2001
 "Rock the Boat" (Bob Sinclar song), featuring Pitbull, Dragonfly and Fatman Scoop, 2011

See also 
 The Boat That Rocked, a 2009 British comedy film
 Rocking the Boat: A Musical Conversation and Journey, a 2007 documentary film